Imperfect Love is a 2020 Chinese drama streaming television series directed by Liu Bao and starring Zhou Xun, Kara Hui, Angie Chiu and Huang Jue. The series is a remake of the award-winning 2010 Japanese TV series Mother. It airs on Tencent Video and IQIYI from March 27 to April 4, 2020.

Plot
The drama is shot from the perspective of women and tells a story about finding light in the darkness and embracing hope in motherhood.

Lin Xu Zhi (Zhou Xun) is a woman who doesn’t have a past. She was adopted and is still scarred from being abandoned by her birth mother. She meets and befriends 7-year-old Mu Lian Sheng (Chen Sinuo), who she quickly realizes is being abused at home by her mother and mother's boyfriend. One night,  she finds Lian Sheng tied up alone in a closet, after a fire breaks out in Lian Sheng's house. Xu Zhi takes the girl into her own care, and they flee from Dalian to Beijing. In caring for the young girl, two broken souls find solace in each other.

Cast
Zhou Xun as Lin Xu Zhi
Chen Sinuo as Mu Lian Sheng / Lin Xiao Ou 
Huang Jue as Tian Fang 
Kara Hui as Yuan Ling
Angie Chiu as Zhong Hui 
Chin Shih-chieh as Li Ze
Tong Yao as Gao Shan
Qu Gaowei as Guo Yue
Cai Yatong as Mu Jing 
Chiang Yunlin as Shang Wu
Zeng Yixuan as Lin Zhi Yan
Chen Yizan as Xiao Oo Zhi
Liu Baisha as Lin Guo Zhi
Kang Fuzhen as Jiang Guo Dong
Yang Bo as Hao Ping 
Sheng Gang Shuai
Guo Tiecheng as Guo Jian Min
He Yuhe as an office clerk
Sun Lei as
Zhao Yali as Su Kui
Ma Weifu as Lao Zhou
Hai Yitian as a lawyer
Lin Zilin
Chi Peng as Aunt Song

Awards and nominations

Broadcast

References

External links

2020 Chinese television series debuts
2020 Chinese television series endings
2020 web series debuts
Chinese television series
Chinese drama television series
Chinese television series based on Japanese television series
Chinese web series
Mandarin-language television shows
Television series by Tencent Pictures
Television series by Tencent Penguin Pictures
Tencent original programming